The Madison Greys were a minor league baseball team based in Madison, South Dakota. In 1920 and 1921, the Greys played as members of the 1920 Class D level South Dakota League in 1920 and its successor, the 1921 Dakota League, while hosting home games at Baughman Park.

History
In 1920, Madison, South Dakota first hosted minor league baseball when the "Madison Greys" began play as charter members of the Class D level South Dakota League. In the eight–team league, the charter franchises joining Madison were the Aberdeen Boosters, Huron Packers, Miller Climbers, Mitchell Kernels, Redfield Reds, Sioux Falls Soos and Wessington Springs Saints.

In their first season of play, the Madison Greys finished in 6th place in the South Dakota League as the league folded during the season. Madison ended the 1920 season with a record of 42–50, playing under managers Ralph Works and Dave Altizer. The South Dakota league disbanded on July 17, 1920. The Saints finished 16.5 games behind the Mitchell Kernels in the final standings.

In 1921, Madison continued play as the league changed names to the Dakota League, reforming after adding the Wahpeton-Breckenridge Twins, based in North Dakota and Minnesota. Madison finished in 5th place in the standings. The Dakota league remained an eight–team Class D level league, with 13–player rosters. Joining the Madison Greys as 1921 league members were the Aberdeen Grays, Huron Packers, Mitchell Kernels, Redfield Red Sox, Sioux Falls Soos, Wahpeton-Breckenridge Twins and Watertown Cubs. The Mitchell Kernels won their second consecutive league championship, with Madison finishing 18.5 games behind. The Greys finished with a 45–50 record under returning manager Dave Altizer.

The Madison franchise did not return to play in the 1922 Dakota League. Madison has not hosted another minor league team.

The ballpark
The Madison Greys teams hosted their 1920 and 1921 minor league home games at Baughman Park. Today, Baughman Park is still in use as a public park, located at 1010 Northeast 1st Street, Madison, South Dakota.

Timeline

Year–by–year records

Notable alumni
Dave Altizer (1920–1921, MGR)
Nick Cullop (1920)
George Pipgras (1921)

See also
Madison Greys players

References

External links
Baseball Reference

Professional baseball teams in South Dakota
Defunct baseball teams in South Dakota
Baseball teams established in 1920
Baseball teams disestablished in 1921
South Dakota League teams
Dakota League teams
Lake County, South Dakota